China Merchants Holdings may refer to the following public companies:
China Merchants Holdings (International) a subsidiary of China Merchants Group
China Merchants Holdings (Pacific) a subsidiary of CMHI listed in Singapore Exchange
China Merchants Fiancee Holdings, a wholly subsidiary of China Merchants Group
China Merchants Industry Holdings, a wholly subsidiary of China Merchants Group